Marcos Paulo Mesquita "Rony" Lopes (born 28 December 1995) is a Portuguese professional footballer who plays as an attacking midfielder or right winger for  club Troyes on loan from Sevilla.

Early life
Born in Belém, Pará, Brazil to a Brazilian father and an Angolan-born Portuguese mother, Lopes moved to Portugal at the age of four.

Club career

Manchester City
Lopes played youth football for Benfica from ages 10 to 15, signing for Manchester City in 2011. He was a surprise addition to the first team's pre-season the following year, but had to wait until 7 January 2013 to make his competitive debut, when he came as an 88th-minute substitute for David Silva in a FA Cup third-round tie against Watford and scored the final goal in the 3–0 win, which made him the youngest ever scorer for the club at the age of 17 years and 9 days.

Lopes was a regular for City's Elite Development Squad in the 2012–13 season, and went on to claim the inaugural Academy Player of the Year award after winning a public vote. He was included in the team that featured in the first match of the UEFA Youth League, netting twice in a 4–1 victory at Viktoria Plzeň. He added a hat-trick in the 6–0 home rout of Bayern Munich.

On 21 January 2014, Lopes started against West Ham United in the second leg of the semi-finals of the Football League Cup. In the game, he assisted Sergio Agüero and Álvaro Negredo to a goal each, in a 3–0 away win (9–0 on aggregate).

On 7 July 2014, Lopes was loaned to Lille until the end of the campaign. His maiden appearance in Ligue 1 occurred on 9 August, in a goalless home draw against Metz. He scored his first goal on 14 September, in a 2–0 victory over Nantes also at the Stade Pierre-Mauroy.

Lopes was included in City's squad for their pre-season tour in Australia. On 5 August, he was promoted to the first team alongside Jason Denayer and Kelechi Iheanacho.

Monaco
On 28 August 2015, Lopes joined Ligue 1 side Monaco for £9 million, sharing teams with a host of compatriots including manager Leonardo Jardim. In early January 2016, he was loaned again to Lille until June.

In July 2016, still owned by Monaco, Lopes re-signed at Lille for one season. He scored a brace in the league opener, but in a 3–2 away loss against Metz.

Lopes scored his first competitive goal for the club on 16 September 2017, when he opened a 3–0 league home defeat of Strasbourg. He started for the first time in the UEFA Champions League on 1 November, and scored in the 1–1 group stage away draw with Beşiktaş.

Sevilla
On 14 August 2019, Lopes signed a five-year contract at Sevilla of the Spanish La Liga in part exchange for Wissam Ben Yedder. In his first season, he appeared in only 14 official matches.

On 29 July 2020, Lopes joined Nice on a season-long loan deal with option to buy. On 16 August 2021, in a similar move, he signed with Olympiacos. He scored his first goal for the latter club on 4 December, in a 3–1 away win against OFI.

Lopes served another loan in the 2022–23 campaign, at Troyes in the French top division.

International career
Lopes chose to represent Portugal internationally, winning caps at every youth level. He appeared with the under-20 side at the 2015 FIFA U-20 World Cup, playing all matches in New Zealand and helping his country reach the quarter-finals.

On 5 January 2014, still aged 18, Lopes made his debut with the under-21s, playing roughly 20 minutes in a 2–0 win over Macedonia for the 2015 UEFA European Championship qualifiers. He first appeared with the full side on 14 November 2017, replacing Gonçalo Guedes late in the second half of a 1–1 friendly draw against the United States.

Lopes was named in a preliminary 35-man squad for the 2018 FIFA World Cup, but did not make the final cut.

Career statistics

Club

International

Honours
Manchester City
Football League Cup: 2013–14
FA Cup runner-up: 2012–13

Lille
Coupe de la Ligue runner-up: 2015–16

Monaco
Coupe de la Ligue runner-up: 2017–18
Trophée des Champions runner-up: 2017, 2018

Sevilla
UEFA Europa League: 2019–20

Olympiacos
Super League Greece: 2021–22

Portugal U19
UEFA European Under-19 Championship runner-up: 2014

References

External links

1995 births
Living people
Brazilian people of Angolan descent
Brazilian people of Portuguese descent
Brazilian emigrants to Portugal
Sportspeople from Belém
Portuguese sportspeople of Angolan descent
Portuguese footballers
Association football midfielders
S.L. Benfica footballers
Manchester City F.C. players
Ligue 1 players
Lille OSC players
AS Monaco FC players
OGC Nice players
ES Troyes AC players
La Liga players
Sevilla FC players
Super League Greece players
Olympiacos F.C. players
UEFA Europa League winning players
Portugal youth international footballers
Portugal under-21 international footballers
Portugal international footballers
Portuguese expatriate footballers
Expatriate footballers in England
Expatriate footballers in France
Expatriate footballers in Monaco
Expatriate footballers in Spain
Expatriate footballers in Greece
Portuguese expatriate sportspeople in England
Portuguese expatriate sportspeople in France
Portuguese expatriate sportspeople in Monaco
Portuguese expatriate sportspeople in Spain
Portuguese expatriate sportspeople in Greece